Camilla de Hollanda Amado, whose stage name was Camilla Amado (7 August 1938 – 6 June 2021) was a Brazilian actress and teacher. She was the daughter of educator Henriette Amado and Gilson Amado, founder of the defunct television station Televisão Educativa, and a distant relative of writer Jorge Amado.

Amado debuted in film in the 1970s. For her performance in the movie The Wedding, directed by Arnaldo Jabor in 1975 and based on the eponymous work of Nelson Rodrigues, Amado won the Kikito Gold award for Best Supporting Actress and the Special Jury Prize at the Gramado Festival.

Amado was married to actor Stepan Nercessian for fourteen years.

Television
 1972 – Time to Live
 1978 – The Leaping Cat – Sofia
 1982 – Summer Sun – Noêmia
 1982 – Chico Anysio Show – Jose Maria
 2003 – The House of the Seven Women – Aunt Angela
 2004 – Heavy Load – Joaquina
 2006 – Yellow Woodpecker Ranch – Queen Linden
 2007 – The Big Family – Dona Isaltina
 2009 – Aline (first season) – Dona Rosa
 2009 – Task Force – Leonor
 2010 – Task Force – Leonor
 2011 – Task Force – Leonor
 2011 – Cordel Encantado – Zefa
 2011 – Aline – Dona Rosa
 2012 – Eternal Love Love – Dona Olga
 2016 – Ligações Perigosas (TV mini-series) – Madre
 2017 – The Big Catch (TV mini-series) – Dona Marieta
 2019 - Topíssima - Zilá da Silva

Film 
 1969 – A Taste of Bitter Feast
 1975 – Who's Afraid of Werewolf? – Iracema
 1975 – The Wedding
 1980 – Partner Adventure 1995 – The Girls – Mother Alix
 1998 – Abolition – Princess Isabel
 2000 – Amélia – Oswalda
 2001 – Condemned to Freedom 2001 – Copacabana – Miloca
 2008 – The Desafinados – Landlady
 2009 – Veronica – D. Rita
 2010 – Me and My Umbrella – D. Nene
 2012 – Prime Time Soap – Maria
 2015 – Cinzento e Negro'' – Armanda

References

External links
 

1938 births
2021 deaths
Actresses from Rio de Janeiro (city)
Brazilian television actresses
Brazilian film actresses
20th-century Brazilian actresses
21st-century Brazilian actresses